Hithadhoo (Dhivehi: ހިތަދޫ) is one of the inhabited islands of Laamu Atoll.

Geography

Demography

References

Islands of the Maldives
Populated places in the Maldives